The 1957–58 season was the 55th year of the club's existence. They played in the Turkish Federation Cup for the cup's second year (It would also be the last). They won it by defeating Galatasaray 2-0 on aggregate, in a two legged final. By winning the tournament, Beşiktaş qualified for the 1958–59 European Cup. Beşiktaş won the cup last year and qualified for the 1957–58 European Cup, but the Turkish Football Federation did not send their names to the draw so they were disqualified. In the İstanbul Football League, Beşiktaş finished 4th, behind Galatasaray, Fenerbahçe and İstanbulspor.

İstanbul Football League

In the 1957–58 season of the İstanbul Football League, Beşiktaş finished 4th.

Turkish Federation Cup
Beşiktaş competed in the Federation Cup for a second time. The professional national league at the time.

First round

Second round

Third round

Beşiktaş won 5-3 on aggregate.

Group stage

By finishing 1st, Beşiktaş qualified for the final.

Final

Beşiktaş won 2-0 on aggregate.

External links
Turkish Federation Cup 1957-58
Turkish Soccer

Beşiktaş J.K. seasons
Besiktas